The Rutan Model 72 Grizzly is a tandem-wing STOL research aircraft designed by Burt Rutan, now preserved at the EAA AirVenture Museum, Oshkosh.  The aircraft exhibited excellent Short Take-Off and Landing (STOL) capabilities, proving that this is also possible with a Rutan-typical canard design.

Design and development
This composite-construction aircraft features three lifting surfaces: A front wing with approximately half the span of the main wing and a classical cruciform empennage.  Front and main wings are connected by a pair of struts with square cross-section which also serve as fuel tanks.  Both wings carry Fowler flaps on part of their span for STOL. The fixed tail-wheel undercarriage has four low-pressure, small-diameter main-wheels, on two cantilever spring struts, with a spring mounted tail-wheel assembly. The four-seat cabin is completely enclosed with a combination of flat, squared and outward-bulged tear-drop shaped windows.

A planned amphibian version of the Grizzly was never realized. Use as a bush plane may conflict with the Grizzly's low wings and Fowler flaps which might interfere with vegetation or obstacles.

Operational history
The career of the Grizzly contains several “firsts”:
	first use of computational methods at Rutan Aircraft Factory for airfoil and wing-system design
	first use of a Fowler-type flap system on the canard surface of a tandem wing aircraft
	first practical three-surface aircraft that paved the way for the later Grumman X-29 or Piaggio Avanti
	an exceptionally long first flight on 22 January 1982 (2.6 hours) exploring a vast area of operability
	first experimental airplane to tow another experimental airplane (the Solitaire) on June 23, 1982

After completion of testing the Grizzly was donated to the EAA AirVenture Museum, Oshkosh in 1997.

Specifications

References

External links
 website on the Grizzly
 photo report
 Aerofiles Grizzly information

Aircraft first flown in 1982
Grizzly
Canard aircraft
Three-surface aircraft
Single-engined tractor aircraft